KJTF is a Christian radio station licensed to North Platte, Nebraska, broadcasting on 89.3 MHz FM.  The station is owned by Tri-State Broadcasting Association.

KJTF plays a variety of Christian Music, as well as Christian talk and teaching programming including: Turning Point with David Jeremiah, Insight for Living with Chuck Swindoll, Back to the Bible, Focus on the Family, Truth for Life with Alistair Begg, Love Worth Finding with Adrian Rogers, the Moody Church hour with Erwin Lutzer, and In Touch with Charles Stanley.

References

External links
KJTF's official website

FCC application

JTF